The Milligan Papers was a BBC radio comedy show, written by John Antrobus and starring Spike Milligan. First broadcast on BBC Radio 4 in 1987, it also featured Chris Langham, John Bluthal, and Antrobus, and is often referred to as A Goon Show for the '80s. It was produced by Paul Spencer.

In 2018, to commemorate Spike's centenary, theatre company Hambledon Productions adapted a selection of episodes for a rural tour.

Airdates And Show Names
28 Jan 1987: The Incredible Case of the Vanishing Flying Scotsman
4 Feb 1987: Jonah And The Whale
11 Feb 1987: From Rags to More Rags
18 Feb 1987: That "Cake" Elusive Pimpernel
25 Feb 1987: The Incurables, Part 1
4 Mar 1987: The Incurables, Part 2

BBC Radio comedy programmes
1987 radio programme debuts